La Bande du Rex (The Gang from the Rex) is the ninth album by French rock singer Jacques Higelin, released in 1980. It is the soundtrack to French director Jean-Henri Meunier's film of the same name.

Track listing

References 

1980 albums
Jacques Higelin albums